Benedetta Valanzano (born May 5, 1985) is an Italian actress. She became famous in 2000 after appearing in a beauty pageant. Since then she has acted in several movies and television series in Italy.

Filmography

Cinema
 Vita Smeralda, directed by Jerry Calà (2006)
 Los Borgia, directed by Antonio Hernández (2006)

Television
 La stagione dei delitti, Rai Due (2004)
 Ho sposato un calciatore, Canale 5 (2005)
 Elisa di Rivombrosa 2, Canale 5 (2005)
 Un posto al sole, Rai Tre (2006/2007/2008/2009)
 Assunta Spina, Rai Uno (2006)
 Il generale dalla chiesa, Canale 5 (2007)
 Capri 2, Rai Uno (2008)
 Vita da paparazzo, Canale 5 (2008)
 La nuova squadra, Rai Tre (2008)
 Mal'aria, Rai Uno (2009)
 Piper, Canale 5 (2009)
 Non smettere di sognare, Canale 5 (2009)

External links 

Italian actresses
Actresses from Naples
1985 births
Living people